Marian Drenceanu (born 1 March 1990) is a Romanian rugby union footballer. He plays the position of lock.

Club career
He played for Timișoara Saracens between 2012 and 2018. At the start of 2019 he transferred to CSM București, in the SuperLiga. Following CSM's dissolution in 2019 he chose to represent Steaua București.

International career
Drenceanu has six caps for Romania. He won his first cap in 2014 against Russian Medvedi.

References

External links

1990 births
Living people
Romania international rugby union players
SCM Rugby Timișoara players
Romanian rugby union players
București Wolves players
CSM București (rugby union) players
CSA Steaua București (rugby union) players
Rugby union locks
Sportspeople from Iași